= Jim Mullins =

American scientist

James I. Mullins is an American scientist. Jim currently is a professor of Microbiology and Medicine at the University of Washington in Seattle.
